Eric Li-luan Chu (born on 7 June 1961) is a Taiwanese politician. He was born into a political family with strong Kuomintang (KMT) ties, and served as Vice Premier of the Republic of China, under Premier Wu Den-yih. Prior to this, Chu served as legislator (1999 to 2001) and as the magistrate of Taoyuan County (2001 to 2009). He was elected as the first mayor of the newly established city of New Taipei on 27 November 2010. On 17 January 2015, he was elected unopposed as Chairman of the Kuomintang, succeeding Ma Ying-jeou. On 17 October 2015, he was chosen as KMT candidate for the 2016 presidential election replacing incumbent candidate Hung Hsiu-chu. Chu was defeated by his opponent Tsai Ing-wen, and subsequently resigned his post as KMT chairman. He was succeeded as mayor of New Taipei by Hou You-yi in 2018.

Early life 
Chu was born in Bade City, Taoyuan County, Taiwan. His ancestral home is Yiwu, Zhejiang, and he is the son of a local Taoyuan County politician who served in the local legislature and also in the National Assembly. Chu's mother is from Daxi Township. Chu is married to Kao Wan-ching; his father-in-law, Kao Yu-jen, is former speaker of the Taiwan Provincial Assembly, chairman of Twinhead International Corp and founder of FiberLogic Communications.

Chu studied at the National Taiwan University, earning a bachelor's degree in management in 1983. After completing compulsory military service in the Republic of China Armed Forces, Chu then went abroad to study at New York University in the United States where he completed a master's degree in finance in 1987 and a PhD in accounting in 1991.

Early career 
After graduation, Chu taught as an assistant professor at City University of New York before returning to teach in Taiwan in 1992. He initially taught as an associate professor in accounting at National Taiwan University and was promoted to a tenured professor in 1997.

Early political career
He ran in the Republic of China legislative election held on 5 December 1998, was elected as a Kuomintang legislator, and took office on 1 February 1999. During his office term, he focused on financial and economic issues of Taiwan.

In 2000, he was appointed Chairman of the Budgetary Committee and the Finance Committee of the Legislative Yuan. He served in these positions for one year until 2001.

Taoyuan County magistrate

2001 Taoyuan County magistrate election 
Chu won the 2001 Taoyuan County Magistrate election held on 1 December 2001 as a member of then-opposition Kuomintang, defeating Democratic Progressive Party (DPP) candidate Perng Shaw-jiin.

2005 Taoyuan County magistrate election
Chu ran for re-election in the 2005 Republic of China local election on 3 December 2005 and defeated DPP challenger Cheng Pao-ching, CEO of Taiwan Salt Company. He then took office for his second term as magistrate on 20 December 2005.

2009 Founders Awards 
In March 2009, Magistrate Chu, with other three local government officials, was named by the Intelligent Community Forum as the recipient of its annual Founders Awards for his effort in digital and technology development. The forum studies the impact of technology on communities.

Grandmother's house named historic site 
According to the Liberty Times, while Chu was serving as magistrate, his grandmother's home in Daxi was designated a historic architectural site; in 2014, after Chu registered to run for chairmanship of the KMT, just prior to the transfer of power to the DPP, the Taoyuan County Government Cultural Affairs Bureau signed contracts of NT$30.17 million (US$1 mil) of public spending to renovate the site.

Resignation from position as County Magistrate 
Chu did not complete his second term. He resigned his post as Taoyuan County Magistrate when he was named vice premier in 2009. He was succeeded by Deputy Magistrate Huang Min-kon (黃敏恭) as acting magistrate on 10 September 2009.

Kuomintang Vice Chairmanship 
During his second term as Magistrate of Taoyuan County, Chu concurrently served as the Vice Chairman of Kuomintang from November 2008 until October 2009.

2009 Straits Forum
Addressing the audience as KMT Vice Chairman during the first Straits Forum in May 2009 held in Xiamen, Fujian, Chu stressed the importance of mindset change in boosting economic development across the strait, choose common development and jointly create a mutual benefit situation for both sides.

ROC Vice Premiership

Vice Premier appointment 
Chu was tapped by President Ma Ying-jeou to be the Vice Premier to Wu Den-yih on 7 September 2009, in a reshuffling of the Executive Yuan due to the slow disaster response to Typhoon Morakot. Chu's position as Magistrate of Taoyuan County was succeeded by Deputy Magistrate Huang Min-kon. At the age of 48, Chu was the youngest Vice Premier in ROC history.

Vice Premier resignation

On 13 May 2010, Chu submitted his resignation to Premier Wu to run for mayor of the newly created New Taipei City, the successor of Taipei County. Financial Supervisory Commission chairperson Sean Chen was tapped to succeed Chu as deputy premier.

New Taipei City Mayoralty

2010 New Taipei City mayoralty election
In May 2010 before the New Taipei City Mayor election, Chu outlined his vision for the city. Noting the gap between New Taipei and Taipei, Chu promised to transform New Taipei if he was elected, where completing the mass rapid transit network in New Taipei will be his top priority. Chu defeated DPP Chairwoman Tsai Ing-wen on 27 November 2010, to become the first mayor of New Taipei on 25 December 2010. He named Hou You-yi, Hsu Chih-chien, and Lee Shih-chuan deputy mayors of the city. Hou and Chen Shen-hsien shared the deputy mayoral post soon after Lee was named Secretary-General of the Executive Yuan on 25 February 2014 and Hsu had stepped down on 30 June 2014 due to health concerns.

Wikileaks
The content of some of Chu's conversations with Stephen Young of the American Institute in Taiwan was included in US diplomatic cables that were released by WikiLeaks in 2011. Chu claims that those cables do not accurately reflect the content of his conversations with Young.

Taiwanese fisherman shooting incident
The Guang Da Xing No. 28 was fishing in disputed water in the South China Sea on 9 May 2013 when the Philippine Coast Guard opened fire on the Taiwanese fishing boat. Chu condemned the shooting and said that he would suspend all of the exchanges between New Taipei City and the Philippines until the Philippine government apologized for the incident, compensated the victim's family and prosecuted the perpetrators.

2014 New Taipei City mayoralty election

On 29 November 2014, Chu won the New Taipei City mayoralty election, defeating his opponent Yu Shyi-kun of the Democratic Progressive Party. He had been expected to win a landslide victory, but he won by slightly more than 1% of the vote total. His second mayoral term started on 25 December 2014.

Kuomintang chairmanship

First term
On 17 January 2015, Chu ran unopposed in the KMT chairmanship election. He was the only candidate to have registered and paid the NT$2 million registration fee. He succeeded Ma Ying-jeou, who had resigned on 3 December 2014 to take responsibility for KMT losses in the ROC local election on 29 November 2014.

Prior to the election, Chu said he had not yet decided on meeting with Communist Party General Secretary Xi Jinping after being elected as KMT chairman. Furthermore, he said that "Cross-strait relations must stick to the current peaceful, open and mutually beneficial path, no matter which party is in power...but the economic benefits brought about by cross-strait development must not only go to a few vested groups...(and) We will pay special attention to an equitable distribution of wealth."

On 4 May 2015, Chu met with General Secretary of the Chinese Communist Party Xi Jinping in Beijing.

During his first term as party chair, Chu also acknowledged that the KMT accumulated much of its wealth illegally, and that these assets should be returned to the nation. In 2000 Chu claimed that these assets total US$3.15 billion; they include 146 plots of land, many in prime locations, as well as 157 houses and buildings. the majority of which were seized from Japanese and Taiwanese in 1945 and subsequently treated as belonging to the party, not the nation. After Chu announced his candidacy for KMT Chairmanship, however, he claimed not to know what assets are held or what their value might be.

Second term
Chu announced that he would run in the 2021 Kuomintang chairmanship election on 2 August 2021. He finished first of four candidates on 25 September 2021, and took office on 5 October 2021.

2016 Republic of China presidential election

KMT candidate nomination
Though Chu had repeatedly refused to run in the 2016 presidential election, he was chosen to be the preferred candidate over the incumbent Hung Hsiu-chu in a KMT congress held at Sun Yat-sen Memorial Hall on 17 October 2015. KMT members in attendance overwhelmingly voted 812 of 891 to replace Hung with Chu. In a post-election speech, Chu apologized to Hung for her dismissal, but continued by saying the KMT had reached a crucial point where it needed to adjust its pace and start anew. He also apologized to New Taipei residents for breaking his promise to serve as mayor until his term ended. The party's decision to replace Hung had been made prior to the meeting, and Chu had apologized to Hung multiple times for the way the party had treated her.

Presidential campaign
On 19 October 2015, Chu announced his intention to temporarily leave mayoral duties to Deputy Mayor Hou You-yi starting the next day. Chu planned to take three months of leave, to focus on his presidential campaign. The monthly salary of NT$190,500 Chu would have collected during this time was to be donated to the New Taipei City treasury.

Election result
Chu suffered an enormous defeat in the 2016 presidential election, losing 18 of 23 counties. He resigned the KMT chairmanship, and returned to the New Taipei City mayorship on 18 January 2016.

Family assets
According to a Control Yuan report issued in 2014, the four members of Chu's immediate family have combined savings of $23.5 million New Taiwan dollars.   Chu also has securities and 11 plots of land in Taipei, Taoyuan City and Tainan; furthermore, he has three homes in Taipei's Shilin District and Neihu District that are worth more than $100 million New Taiwan dollars.  This same report reveals that from 2012 to 2014, while serving as New Taipei City mayor, his assets grew by NT$7.5 million ($251,200 United States dollars).

References

External links 
 
 
 New Taipei Mayor – New Taipei Government Portal

|-

|-

|-

|-

|-

|-

1961 births
Living people
Kuomintang Members of the Legislative Yuan in Taiwan
Magistrates of Taoyuan County
Mayors of New Taipei
Members of the Kuomintang
Members of the 4th Legislative Yuan
National Taiwan University alumni
Politicians of the Republic of China on Taiwan from Taoyuan City
New York University Stern School of Business alumni
Taoyuan City Members of the Legislative Yuan
Kuomintang presidential nominees
Chairpersons of the Kuomintang
Intelligent Community Forum